Modal metaphysics is a branch of philosophy that investigates the metaphysics underlying statements about possible or a priori statements.

See also
 Modal logic
 Modal neo-logicism

References

Subfields of metaphysics